

nUbuntu or Network Ubuntu was a project to take the existing Ubuntu operating system LiveCD and Full Installer and remaster it with tools needed for penetration testing servers and networks.  The main idea is to keep Ubuntu's ease of use and mix it with popular penetration testing tools. Besides usage for network and server testing, nUbuntu will be made to be a desktop distribution for advanced Linux users.

Contents 
nUbuntu uses the light window manager Fluxbox.

It includes some of the most used security programs for Linux, such as Wireshark, nmap, dSniff, and Ettercap.

History 
 2005-12-18 - nUbuntu Project is born, developers release Testing 1
 2006-01-16 - nUbuntu Live developers release Stable 1
 2006-06-26 - nUbuntu Live developers release version 6.06
 2006-10-16 - nUbuntu featured in Hacker Japan, a Japanese Hacker Magazine
 2006-11-21 - nUbuntu Live developers release version 6.10

As of April 4, 2010, the official website is closed with no explanation.

Releases
Below is a list of previous and current releases.

Further reading 
 Russ McRee (Nov 2007) Security testing with nUbuntu, Linux Magazine, issue 84

External links

Operating system distributions bootable from read-only media
Ubuntu derivatives
Pentesting software toolkits
Linux distributions

de:Liste von Linux-Distributionen#Ubuntu-Derivate